Onyewuchi Francis Ezenwa  (born 1968) is the senator representing Imo east senatorial district in the 9th assembly and the former member of the Nigerian Federal House of Representatives He represented the Owerri-Municipal/Owerri-North/West-Federal Constituency of Imo State under the platform of Peoples Democratic Party in the Federal House of Representatives.

Awards and honours
 NUJ legacy award

References

1968 births
Living people
All Progressives Grand Alliance politicians
University of Nigeria alumni